Truchlivý Bůh is a Czech novel, written by Jiří Kratochvil. It was first published in 2000.

References

2000 Czech novels